Pilea grandifolia is an undershrub native only to Jamaica.  It is sometimes cultivated.

References

grandifolia
Endemic flora of Jamaica